At this early point in the history of license plates in the United States of America, none of the 45 states, territories, or the District of Columbia, was issuing its own plates. The state of New York remained the only state that required vehicle owners to register their automobiles. The system of using the owner's initials as the registration number, begun in 1901, remained in effect. This would change in 1903 when a number was assigned to each owner to display on their vehicle. Across the country the increases in the number of automobiles was being noticed, and there were many cities, like Chicago, that had already begun to require their owners to register their vehicles.

Passenger baseplates
In the table below, a light green background indicates that the owner of the vehicle was required to provide their own license plates. These plates are called "prestate" by most collectors. In the prestate era many states only provided the license plate number on a small disc or on paper, and the owner was required to have their license plate(s) made. These early license plates were created from kits that could be purchased at a hardware store, may have been available from automobile clubs or associations, they were forged by blacksmiths or other tradesmen, or the owner may have made their own plate with whatever materials they had on hand. Prestate plates were made from a variety of materials, but most often were made of leather, steel, or wood.

State registrations
The following chart shows the year each U.S. state, territory, and the District of Columbia began to require license plates (prestate) and when they started to provide license plates. In some cases locations did not issue any prestate plates or no prestate plates are known, and this is indicated by the table cell not having a date. Clicking on a state name or a year in the table will take you to those articles.

See also

Antique vehicle registration
Electronic license plate
Motor vehicle registration
Vehicle license

References

External links

1902 in the United States
1902